Lucy Virginia French (pen name, L'Inconnue (The Unknown); March 16, 1825 – March 31, 1881) was a 19th-century American author from Virginia. Her blank verse was considered especially strong, and her themes were well chosen, mostly in their measure.

French belonged to a cultured and wealthy family. Educated at Washington, Pennsylvania, she moved to Memphis, Tennessee, where she lived until her marriage in 1853, to John Hopkins French, living after this at "Forest Home," near McMinnville, Tennessee. Her first volume of poems, "Wind Whispers," appeared in 1856. She wrote "Tecumseh's Foot," "The Great River," "The Lyre of Time," "The Palmetto and the Pine," "The Years," "Mammy," "Liberty Bells," and other poems, besides several novels and dramas. She took a keen interest in the political questions of the day and wrote about them. Her first novel, "My Roses," appeared in 1872, and her last one, "Darlingtonia," in 1879. Between the years 1856 and 1879, she was actively engaged as literary editor of a number of magazines and newspapers. She wrote under the name L'Inconnue (the unknown). Among her friends were James Russell Lowell, Henry Wadsworth Longfellow, Oliver Wendell Holmes Sr., John Greenleaf Whittier, and William Cullen Bryant.

Early years

Lucy Virginia Smith was born March 16, 1825, in Accomack County, Virginia. Her parents were Mease W. Smith and Elizabeth Parker. She was named for the state where she was born. Her parents belonged to cultured and wealthy families. Her mother, also a Virginian, and a relative of Gov. Henry A. Wise, was Miss Elizabeth Parker. Her grandfather, Col. Thomas Parker, was a wealthy merchant in the East Indian and the South American trade, but was better known as "Fighting Tom" Parker, having served as a cavalry officer of the American Revolutionary War. Her father, Mease W. Smith, was at one time president of Washington College, Virginia (now Washington and Lee University). He had previously held the chair of Greek and Latin in that institution. He also filled the office of chancellor of Virginia, and was prominent as an educator and as a lawyer.

By the early death of her mother, the child was left to the care of her grandparents. She and her younger sister were sent to Washington, Pennsylvania, for their education, and after their graduation from Mrs. Hannah's School, they returned to their father's home on the eastern shore of Virginia. But their father had married again, and a new influence had entered into the old home. Virginia soon decided that she wanted to leave. It was not long afterwards that she and her young sister Lide (later, Mrs. Meriwether) moved to Tennessee.

Career
French and her sister became teacher in Memphis, in the 1840s. In 1849, under the name of L'Inconnuehe, French wrote for the Louisville Journal, of which George D. Prentice was editor, and many of her poems, songs and legends first appeared in its columns. Her friends at that time were Lowell, Longfellow, Emerson, Holmes, Realf, Bryant, and Whittier. In 1852, she became the editor of Southern Ladies Book, continuing till the following year.

French was a versatile writer. Besides many poems, she was the author of several novels and dramas of literary merit. She  also had an interest in the political questions of her day. During the American Civil War, she favored preserving the Union, and pleaded earnestly for restoration. Throughout the remaining years of her life, she wrote, worked, and prayed for reconciliation. Though the North was the home of her early childhood, the South was her birthplace and the home of her maturer years.

Two poems which illustrate French's freedom from political and sectional prejudice are "Shermanized," and "The Palmetto and the Pine." The first was written just after Sherman's march to the sea; the latter appeared in 1876, in the Saturday Evening Post, of which William Cullen Bryant was then editor, and was a direct rebuke to a memorable congressional speech of the Hon. James G. Blaine, whom she had known from her girlhood. "Shermanized" is well remembered throughout the South; "like the flash of the yataghan from a velvet sheath," was the comment of a noted writer, who admired the spirit of the poem and of the author. "The Palmetto and the Pine" was reproduced with illustrations in the July 1899 number of The American Illustrated Methodist Magazine, while another poem, "Mammy," a home picture of the South before the war, appeared in the February 1900 issue. "Liberty Bells," written in 1876, was characteristic of the spirit of unity which was the theme of many of French's later poems.

French's first volume of poems, "Wind Whispers," appeared in 1856, followed the same year by a tragedy in five acts, "Istalilxo, the Lady of Tula," the scene of which was laid in Mexico before its conquest by Cortez. Between the years 1856 and 1879, French was actively engaged as literary editor of a number of magazines and newspapers. In 1872, her first novel, "My Roses," was published, and in 1879 her last novel, "Darlingtonia," appeared serially in the Detroit Free Press.

Personal life
A poem entitled "The Lost Louisiana," which appeared in one of the New Orleans dailies, proved to be the precursor of French's marriage. John Hopkins French, standing in front of the St. Charles Hotel, New Orleans, was approached by a newsboy selling the morning papers: "All about the lost 'Louisiana'!" the boy shouted. Mr. French's interest was aroused by the words "lost Louisiana." Some years before, he had been a passenger on the steamboat, "Belle of Clarksville," and had nearly died in a collision between that steamer and the "Louisiana." Besides the detailed account of the accident, the paper contained the story of the accident in verse. The poem was signed "L'Inconnue." The beauty of the verses and the name "L'Inconnue," which was already well known throughout the South, added to Mr. French's personal interest in the theme, that he clipped the poem from the paper and placed it in his wallet. Not long after, Mr. French was a passenger on a steamer. A poem in a newspaper he found on board had a strange interest for him. It was entitled "One or Two?", and the author was L'Inconnue. "Sweet, simple and musical," he thought; so different from the majestic nature of "The Lost Louisiana," still in his wallet. On the impulse of the moment, he said to himself: "I will quit this boat at Memphis. I will see L'Inconnue, and I will ask her if we shall be "One or Two?" On the day after his arrival at Memphis, while making some purchases in a bookstore, a young woman entered and bought a magazine. Mr. French was attracted by her looks, and after she walked out, he asked the salesman the name of the customer. "Miss Lucy Virginia Smith," the clerk replied. Mr. French was surprised as he had just seen L'Inconnue. They married on January 12, 1853, in the Episcopal Church. After an extended honeymoon, the pair returned to Tennessee, and resided at "Forest Home," near McMinnville, Tennessee, the homestead of the French family.

Although her health had been frail for several months, her last illness was short. She died March 31, 1881, at "Forest Home", near McMinnville.

Selected works 
 1856, Wind Whispers 
 1856, Istalilxo
 1856, The Lady of Tula 
 1867, Legends of the South 
 1872, My Roses 
 1879, Darlingtonia

References 

 Cathi Carmack, "Lucy Virginia French,"  Tennessee Encyclopedia of History and Culture, 2002. Accessed August 27, 2008
"French, Lucy Virginia (Smith)." American Authors 1600–1900. H. W. Wilson Company, NY, 1938.

Attribution

Bibliography

External links
 

1825 births
1881 deaths
Poets from Virginia
Poets from Tennessee
People from Accomack County, Virginia
19th-century American women writers
19th-century American poets
Pseudonymous women writers
American women poets
American women novelists
19th-century American novelists
Novelists from Virginia
Novelists from Tennessee
People from McMinnville, Tennessee
19th-century pseudonymous writers